Zurab Revazovich Kokoyev (born 14 February 1959 in Tskhinvali, South Ossetian Autonomous Oblast, Georgian SSR, Soviet Union) is a South Ossetian politician and was a member of South Ossetia's parliament, where he was one of three vice-speakers, and Chairman of the Committee for construction, industry, transport and communications. He is the leader of the Unity Party, which is allied with former President of South Ossetia Eduard Kokoity.

Kokoyev was first deputy prime minister from October 2003 until 31 December 2005 and acting Prime Minister from May until July 2005. Before this, he was head of the administration of Tskhinvali district since 2002.

Kokoyev is married and has a daughter.

References

Living people
1959 births
Prime Ministers of South Ossetia
People from Tskhinvali
Unity Party (South Ossetia) politicians